The 9th International Emmy Awards took place on November 23, 1981, in New York City. The award ceremony, presented by the International Academy of Television Arts and Sciences (IATAS), honors all programming produced and originally aired outside the United States.

Ceremony 
The 9th International Emmys ceremony took place at the Sheraton New York Times Square Hotel in New York City. 110 programs from 51 television networks from 22 countries competes for the awards. Australian TV show A Town Like Alice won best drama, beating out Yorkshire Television's The Reason of Things and Granada TV's The Good Soldier. ABC News President Roone Arledge was honored with a Founders Award for his work on ABC's Wide World of Sports. British Sir Huw Wheldon, chief executive of the BBC, received the board's Director Award.

Winners

Best Drama 
 A Town Like Alice (Australia: Mariner Films-Channel Seven)

Best Documentary 
 Charters Pour L'Enfer (France: Societe Nationale de Television I)

Best Performing Arts 
 Sweeney Todd: Scenes from the Making of a Musical (Great Britain: London Weekend Television)

Best Popular Arts Program 
 Vinicius para Crianças - Arca de Noé (Brazil: Globo TV Network)

References 

International Emmy Awards ceremonies
International
International